Reinhard Pisec (born 4 March 1961) is an Austrian politician who has been a Member of the Federal Council for the Freedom Party of Austria (FPÖ) since 2010.

He graduated from the University of Vienna with a BA in History in 2012.

References

1961 births
Living people
University of Vienna alumni
Members of the Federal Council (Austria)
Freedom Party of Austria politicians